Busquístar is a small community located in the province of Granada, Spain. It is located in a region called The Alpujarras. According to the 2013 census (INE), the city has a population of 265 inhabitants.

References

External links 
Tourist information and Las Alpujarras community portal - Busquístar

Municipalities in the Province of Granada